Ethiopian Olympic Committee (IOC code: ETH) is the National Olympic Committee representing Ethiopia. It was created in 1948 and recognized by the International Olympic Committee in 1954.

Presidents
Ato Assefa Mamo
Dagmawit Girmay (–2009)
Birhane Kidanemariam (2009– ?)
Dr Ashebir Woldegiorgis ( - Present)

See also
Ethiopia at the Olympics

External links 

Ethiopia at Olympic.org

Ethiopia
Olympic
Ethiopia at the Olympics
1948 establishments in Ethiopia
Sports organizations established in 1948